The Colombia railway network has a total length of . The state-owned railway company, Ferrocarriles Nacionales de Colombia (National Railways of Colombia), was liquidated in the 1990s. Since then passenger service is provided as tourist trains on the Bogotá savanna railway, now called Turistren, between Bogotá and Zipaquirá, and Coopsercol that provides general daily passenger service around Barrancabermeja, and its surroundings (Sogmoso, Garcia Cadena, Puerto Berrio, and Puerto Parra).

Railway concessions 
Railway concessions were awarded on July 27, 1999, to Ferrocarriles del Norte de Colombia S.A. (FENOCO), as the Atlantic concession, and on November 4, 1998, to the Sociedad Concesionaria de la Red Férrea del Pacífico SA, later named Tren de Occidente SA as the Pacific concession.

In November 2009, the Colombian government set up a new team of consultants and specialists to oversee the estimated $440m Sistema Ferroviario Central railway concession. The project involves building a  railway from La Dorada to Chiriguaná, linking Colombia's central area to the Santa Marta port on the Atlantic coast. Part of the proposed project are the construction of the La Dorada stretch, renovating the stretches connecting the districts of La Dorada and Buenos Aires, Puerto Berrío, Envigado and La Dorada and Facatativá, and maintaining the Chiriguaná-Buenos Aires stretch. The tender was suspended due to concerns of corruption, but restarted in February 2011.

Investment programmes 

There is a US$600 million investment programme planned for 2008 and studies for a US$350 million new line between Puerto Berrío and Saboya. Under this contract sections of the Atlantic network Neiva – Villavieja and 177 km Ibagué – La Dorada would be built. Other sections to be built include Sogamoso – Tunja and Puerto Berrío – Cisneros.

China is looking into constructing a  stretch of railway that would complete the link between the port cities Buenaventura and Cartagena, connecting Colombia's Pacific and Caribbean coasts. This railway alternative would compete with the Panama Canal. Besides linking two coasts, China aims to make the import of Colombian coal and the export of Chinese manufactured goods to the Americas easier with this railway. Colombia hopes China's growing economic presence in the region will further the ratification of the Free Trade Agreement with the United States, the country's biggest trading partner.

A £47m agreement between the Colombian Ministry of Transport and UK Deputy Prime Minister Nick Clegg on February 3, 2014, plans to allow for the rehabilitation of two narrow gauge railway lines (one,  line from La Dorada to Chiriguaná and a second,  line from Belencito to Bogotá). The construction will use local contractors and is expected to take 18 to 24 months. The lines will be for freight traffic and the government is funding the construction but plans to privatize the route upon completion.

Stations served

Metro 

Medellín is the only city thus far (2019) to have built a metro (rapid transit) system. Planning for a Bogotá Metro has been underway for years, and is hoped to open in 2028. Construction started in October 2020.

Table

Railway links with adjacent countries 
  Venezuela – (Railroad of Cúcuta) - currently inoperative, proposed to be restored
  Brazil – no
  Ecuador – no
  Peru – no
  Panama – no

See also 

 Antioquia Railway
 Transport in Colombia
List of railway stations in Colombia

References

Further reading

External links 

 UNHCR Map